Jeffrey Leiden, M.D., Ph.D. is the executive chairman of Vertex Pharmaceuticals, a biotechnology company based in Boston, Massachusetts. He was initially appointed to the board of directors of the company in 2009 and was CEO and president from February 2012 to March 2020.

Early life 
Leiden grew up in Glencoe, a suburb north of Chicago. His mother was a primary school teacher, and his father was a clinical psychologist with a PhD in psychology. He has one sister. His grandparents on his mother’s side were Russian immigrants. At ten years old he learned to scuba dive, and by eleven he was a certified scuba instructor.

Education
Leiden attended a progressive public school in Glencoe, IL called North School which had a special self-paced learning program. In elementary school Leiden skipped second grade and started the University of Chicago after his junior year at New Trier East High School, at the age of 15.

He received his bachelor's degree in biological sciences at age 18, a Ph.D. in virology at age 21 and his M.D. at age 23 from the University of Chicago, where he later became Chief of Cardiology. He was elected to several honors societies, including Phi Beta Kappa and Alpha Omega Alpha. Between 1982 and 1987, Leiden was a clinical fellow in cardiology at the Brigham and Women’s Hospital, the Harvard Medical School and a postdoctoral fellow in medicine at the Dana–Farber Cancer Institute.

Career

Howard Hughes Medical Institute, University of Michigan 
In 1987, Leiden was appointed assistant professor of medicine and assistant investigator in the Howard Hughes Medical Institute at the University of Michigan in Ann Arbor.

Rawson Professor of Medicine, University of Chicago 
In 1992, Leiden moved to the University of Chicago as the Rawson Professor of Medicine and Pathology and chief of the Division of Cardiology.

Cardiogene 
In 1996, Leiden, along with Drs. Elizabeth and Gary Nabel founded Cardiogene, a gene therapy company, which was subsequently acquired by Boston Scientific.

Harvard School of Public Health and Medical School 
In 1999, Leiden was appointed the Elkin Blout Professor of Biological Sciences at the Harvard School of Public Health and professor of medicine at the Harvard Medical School.

Abbott Labs 
Leiden moved to Abbott Labs in June 2000, as senior vice president and chief scientific officer. Later that year, he was promoted to president and chief operating officer and oversaw all aspects of the company’s global pharmaceutical business, where he led the development and launch of Kaletra and Humira.

Clarus Ventures 
In 2006, Leiden joined Clarus Ventures as a managing director. At Clarus, Leiden founded and chaired the boards of Lycera Corporation and Variation Biotechnologies, and served as chairman of the board of TyRx, Inc., which was subsequently acquired by Medtronic.

Vertex
Leiden served as chairman, president and chief executive officer of Vertex from 2012 to 2020. Under his leadership, Vertex developed and launched Kalydeco, Orkambi, Symdeko and Trikafta – the first medicines to treat the underlying cause of cystic fibrosis. The FDA approved Trikafta on October 21, 2019.

In 2015 Leiden established a collaboration between Vertex and CRISPR Therapeutics that led to the discovery and development of CTX001, the first gene editing treatment to show curative potential for two human genetic diseases, sickle cell disease and beta thalassemia.

In 2015 Vertex shareholders voted to recommend reducing Leiden's compensation from its 2014 estimated figure of US$48.5 million. By 2017 his earnings totaled approximately US$17.3 million. Also under his leadership, Vertex acquired Semma Therapeutics for $950 million in 2019. The company developed stem cell-derived therapies including the experimental cell therapy for Type 1 diabetes known as VX-880.

On October 24, 2019, Vertex reached an agreement with NHS England for all currently licensed Vertex cystic fibrosis medicines, having previously reached similar agreements with countries including Scotland, Ireland and France. While Leiden served as chairman, the market capitalization of Vertex Pharmaceuticals increased from $7.74 billion at the beginning of 2012 to $69.97 billion in April 2020.

On April 1, 2020, Leiden transitioned to the role of executive chairman. He was succeeded by Reshma Kewalramani, who was previously the company's chief medical officer. Leiden will serve as executive chairman until April 2024.

Boards and awards
He is an elected member of the National Academy of Medicine, the American Academy of Arts and Sciences, the American Society for Clinical Investigation and the Association of American Physicians. He currently serves as a director of the Massachusetts Mutual Life Insurance Company, and was the former vice chairman of Shire Pharmaceuticals and was formerly a director of PathAI, Millennium Pharmaceuticals, Abbott Labs, Quest Diagnostics, and TAP Pharmaceuticals. Leiden is also the chairman of Casana, a home health monitoring company. In May 2022 Leiden was appointed as Chairman of the Board of Odyssey Therapeutics, a company developing novel medicines for cancer and auto-immune disease.

Leiden was named a Crain’s Chicago Business 40 Under 40 in 1994; and served as a member of the NHLBI Board of Scientific Counselors between 1994 and 1999. In 2000, he was president of the American Society for Clinical Investigation.

In 2017, Ernst and Young named Leiden an Entrepreneur of the Year in Life Sciences. In 2018, the Massachusetts Biotechnology Council awarded Leiden the Henri A. Termeer Innovative Leadership Award; and the Greater Boston Chamber of Commerce named Leiden to the Academy of Distinguished Bostonians. Leiden was also named one of Boston Business Journal’s Power 50 for several years, including most recently in 2022. In 2018 and 2020, he was named as part of Boston Magazine’s 100 Most Influential People in Boston and was honored as a New Englander of the Year by the New England Council. In 2018 he was named “Best Biopharma CEO” by STAT News. In December 2020 Jeffrey Leiden was honored with the Forbes Lifetime Achievement in BioPharma Award at the 2020 Forbes Healthcare Summit.

Leiden also serves as co-chairman of the Massachusetts’s Governor’s Digital Healthcare Council and the Governor’s STEM Advisory Council.

Leiden was ranked 13th on Forbes' list of most innovative leaders for 2019, the highest-ranking leader in the healthcare/biotech sector.

He is trustee of the Boston Symphony Orchestra.

He is also chairman of the board of the Massachusetts Competitive Partnership.

Leiden is a member of the MIT Presidential CEO Advisory Board.

In November 2022 Leiden was named as one of several strategic advisors for the newly launched Life Sciences Private Capital, a private equity division of J.P. Morgan.

He is a director of the Massachusetts Competitive Partnership (MACP) and previously served as chair from January 2020 to December 2022.

Philanthropy
In December 2017, Leiden and his wife Lisa established a professorship in translational medicine at the Brigham and Women’s Hospital and Harvard Medical School. The Leidens are also major donors to the Museum of Fine Arts, Boston, Ariadne Labs and the Bottom Line Foundation.

References

Living people
American health care chief executives
Harvard Medical School people
University of Chicago alumni
Year of birth missing (living people)
Chief executives in the pharmaceutical industry
University of Michigan faculty
Members of the National Academy of Medicine